This is a brief listing of television channels in the Caribbean region. Note: All channels broadcast in the NTSC standard, unless otherwise stated.

Anguilla 
 ZJF-TV 3 (Anguilla TV) Anguilla
 KCNTV4 – Channel 141

Antigua and Barbuda 
 V2C-TV 10 (formerly ZAL-TV) CMatt Communications (ABS-TV/Radio) – Antigua and Barbuda

Aruba 
 ATV 8/15 (Aruba Broadcasting Company/NBC) – Oranjestad, Aruba 
 Telearuba 13/23/313 (SETAR) – Pos Chikito, Aruba / Oranjestad, Aruba 
 Canal 22 – Sta Cruz, Aruba / Oranjestad, Aruba
 Aruba.tv Channel 49 - Oranjestad, Aruba

Bahamas 
 ZNS-TV 13 (Channel 13) – Nassau, Bahamas / Freeport, Bahamas
 JCN Channel 14
 NB12 
 BCN
 Bahamas Real Estate Channel
 Parliament 40
 BTC TV
 ILTV Studios

Barbados 
 8PX-TV 8 (Caribbean Broadcasting Corporation) – Bridgetown, Barbados

Future 
 Public Broadcast Service

Cable-only 
 Caribbean Cooking Channel
 CaribVision
 Discover Barbados TV
 Multi-Choice TV

Belize

National 
 Channel 5 – Belize City-based
 Channel 7 – Belize City-based
 Channel 10 – San Ignacio & Santa Elena-based
 CTV3 News – Orange Walk Town-based

Cable-only 
 The National Channel (TNC10) – Red Creek Village-based
 Belize Broadcasting Network (BBN9) – Belize City-based
 Channel 3 (CTV3) – Orange Walk-based
 Krem Television – Belize City-based
 Love Television – Belize City-based
 Open Learning Television (OLTV) – Belize City-based
 Plus TV – Belmopan-based

Bermuda 
 Bermuda Broadcasting Company
 ZFB-TV (ABC) 7 – Hamilton, Bermuda
 ZBM-TV (CBS) 9 – Hamilton

Bonaire 
 PJB-TV 6 (Tele Curaçao, Bonaire/Saba)
 PJC-TV 8 (Tele Curaçao, Curaçao)

British Virgin Islands 
 See Television stations in Road Town

Cayman Islands 
 Cayman27 / CITN

Cable-only 
 Discover Cayman TV
 Cayman Real Estate Channel
 Island 24 (I24) – Cayman Islands
 Caribbean Gospel TV ( Logic Cable Ch. 48)

Cuba 
 See list of television stations in Cuba

Curaçao 
 Televishon Direct kanal 13 (TV Direct 13), Curaçao
 PJC-TV 8 (Tele Curaçao, Curaçao)
 CBA Television,  Curaçao
 Nos Pais Television,  Curaçao

Dominica 
 No domestic terrestrial television stations; Marpin Telecoms and SAT Telecommunications Ltd, Dominica's cable TV operators both offer locally produced programming, plus channels in NTSC from the US, Latin America and the Caribbean, as well as Guadeloupe and Martinique (converted from SECAM). SAT Telecommunications Ltd delivers its offering via digital cable with the use of set top boxes whereas Marpin still uses traditional analogue.
 Marpin Television (Marpin 2K4 Ltd., Flow Dominica)
 CBN4 (Cable Broadcasting Network, Digicel Dominica)

Dominican Republic 
AME Canal 47
Antena 21
Antena Latina Canal 7
CERTV – Canal 4
Aster TV
Carivision International
CDN TV
CDN 2
Digital 15
Telemedios Dominicano Canal 25
Color Visión (Canal 9)
Coral 39
Digital Quince
NDTV (The Dominican Channel)
Santo Domingo TV
Supercanal Caribe
TV Dominicana
Tele Futuro canal 23
Tele Contacto Canal 57
Tele Antillas Canal 2
Telemicro Canal 5
Tele Centro Canal 13
Teleradio America
Telesistema Dominicano
Tele Universo (Canal 29)
Tele Union
MegaVision Canal 43
Super TV Canal 55
Red Nacional de Noticias (RNN) Canal 27
Tele Canal 38
Cibao TV Club Canal 53
Virus TV Canal 20
Merka-TV
Telemilenio canal 50
Vega TV
Super TV 3 La Vega
Tele Vida canal 40
 See also Template:Dominican Republic TV

Grenada 
 Grenada Broadcasting Network – G.B.N. T.V.
 Meingingfull television M.T.V. – Grenada
 Grenada Information Services- G.I.S.
 Saga Boy Communications-S.B.C.

Cable-only 
 Gayelle TV (cable) – Trinidad and Tobago
 Community Channel 6-CC6 (cable) – Flow Grenada (Columbus Communications (Grenada) LTD.)

Guadeloupe 
Note: All transmissions in Guadeloupe are in digital terrestrial television

Local channels
 Channel 1, Guadeloupe La 1ère
 Channel 3, Canal 10
 Channel 4, France 2
 Channel 5, France 3
 Channel 6, France 4
 Channel 7, France 5
 Channel 9, ARTE
 Channel 10, franceinfo
 Channel 11, Éclair Télévision (ETV)
 Channel 12, Alizés Guadeloupe

On cable TV (SFR Caraïbe), local channels are
 Guadeloupe La 1ère
 Canal 10
 Éclair Télévision
 Alizés Guadeloupe

Guyana 

Note: All transmissions in Guyana are in analog television

GWTV CH 2
TARZIE TV CH 5
CNS CH 6
WHRM CH 7
DTV CH 8
RCA TV 8 (CHARITY)
HBTV CH 9
GLCT CH 10
NCN CH 11
RBS CH 13
MTV CH 14
PCN CH 15
HGPTV CH 16 | Cable 67
NTN CH 18 | Cable 89
CTV CH 19
HJTV/STVS CH 21 | Cable 72
FIRST LIGHT TV CH 23 | Cable 74
CGTN CH 27
TVG CH 28
SKAR TV CH 46 |102

Haiti 
 Haiti TV

Port-au-Prince

 Canal 4 Télé Eclair
 Canal 5 Télémax
 Canal 6 Radio Tele 6 Univers – Les Cayes, Sud http://radiotele6univers.net/
 Canal 8 TNH (Télévision Nationale d'Haiti)
 Canal 11 Canal 11
 Canal 13 Télé Timoun/
 Canal 16 Télé Shalom
 Canal 18 Radio Télé Ginen
 Canal 20 Tele Podium
 Canal 22 Tele Caraïbes
 Canal 24 Tele Lumiere
 Canal 28 Kanal Kreyol
 Canal 30 Tele Variete Haiti
 Canal 32 Tele Pa Nou
 Canal 34 Tele 34
 Canal 36 Tele Antillaise
 Canal 38 Canal Bleu
 Canal 40 Tele Star
 Canal 42 Tele Antilles
 Canal 44 Tele Pluriel
 Canal 46 Tele Maxima
 Canal 50 TV Numerique Multicanal
 Canal 52 Tele Metropole

Other areas in Haiti
 
 Canal 4 TNH
 Canal 4 Télé Caramel – Les Cayes, Sud
 Canal 6 TV Nord'Ouest
 Canal 6 Radio Tele 6 Univers – Les Cayes, Sud http://radiotele6univers.net/
 Canal 7 Tele 7 Cap-Haïtien
 Canal 7  Tele Yaguana - Leogane
 Canal 9 Tele Cap-Haïtien
 Canal 9 Tele Provinciale 9/TNH, Gonaïves
 Canal 10 Tele Nami- Les Cayes, Sud
 Canal 11 Tele RTGS – Les Cayes, Sud
 Canal 10 Tele Maxima
 Canal 11 Ambiance TV 11, Jacmel
 Canal 12 TV de la Metropole du Sud, Cayes
 Canal 16  Television Hirondelle, Cayes
 Canal 12 TNH, Cap-Haïtien
 Canal 15 Saint-Marc
 Canal 28 Tele La Brise, Camp-Perrin
 Canal 65 RTC 65, Saint-Marc

Jamaica

Kingston 
Ination TV 
 Love TV Channel 6, Kingston, Jamaica / Saint Andrew Parish, Jamaica
 TVJ ZQI-TV Channel 11, Kingston, Jamaica
 Love TV Channel 17, Kingston, Jamaica / Saint Andrew Parish, Jamaica
 CETv! The Family Network (Cable)
 CVM TV Channel 9, Kingston, Jamaica / Saint Andrew Parish, Jamaica
 Hype TV (cable & DirecTV)
 RE TV (cable only)
 JUICE TV (Cable only) Mandeville, Jamaica
 Mercy and Truth Ministries Television channel 671, channel 94 and channel 745 (MTM TV), Kingston, Jamaica
 Caribbean Gospel TV ( Digicel Ch. 27)

SportsMax (cable only)

Montego Bay 
 Love TV; Channel 2 - Montego Bay
 Eplus TV; Cornwall Communications Ltd.
 ZQI-TV; Channel 9, Montego Bay / Flower Hill, Jamaica
 CVM TV; Channel 11 Montego Bay, Jamaica / Flower Hill, Jamaica
 Mercy and Truth Ministries Television (MTM TV) Channel 671 on FLOW Telecommunications Ltd.

Ocho Rios (Lillyfield) 
 Love TV Channel 3 Ocho Rios, Jamaica (Lillyfield)
 CVM TV Channel 10 Ocho Rios, Jamaica (Lillyfield)
 Mercy and Truth Ministries Television (MTM TV) channel 68

Port Antonio 
 ZQI-TV; Channel 8, Port Antonio
 CVM TV; Channel 13, Port Antonio

Coopers Hill 
 ZQI-TV; Channel 7, Coopers Hill, Jamaica
 CVM TV; Channel 9, Coopers Hill, Jamaica

Other areas of Jamaica 
 CVM TV Channel 4, Marley Hill, Jamaica
 Love TV Channel 8, Huntley, Jamaica
 TVJ Channel 9, Yallahs, Jamaica
 TVJ Channel 10
 CVM Channel 12, Cabbage Hill, Jamaica
 TVJ Channel 12, Oracabessa, Jamaica
 TVJ Channel 13, Huntley, Jamaica
 CETv! The Family Network Portmore, Spanish Town, St. Andrew
 TVJ Channel 10, Morant Bay, St. Thomas
 CVM TV Channel 12, Morant Bay, St. Thomas
 MTM TV channel 69 (St. Ann) Channel 671 FLOW islandwide
 Caribbean Gospel TV ( Digicel Ch. 27)

Cable-only 
 Hype TV – Premiere Caribbean Entertainment TV Station based in Kingston
 Logic One Limited – Digital Picture Perfect Cable TV
 Eplus TV- FLOW Channel 391 403 on the HD box, With over 1.3 million views monthly, HD ready Most interactive channel on cable. 
 RE TV – Music and Entertainment from Jamaica
 TVJ SPORTS NETWORK – Airs regional sports based in Kingston
 CVM PLUS – Airs regional sports based in Kingston
 CaribV TV – Caribbean Family Entertainment
 CTV – The #1 Station for Arts and Culture in Jamaica
 SportsMax – The Caribbean's first and only 24-hour sports cable channel, based in Kingston, Jamaica, distributing its signal to 23 other territories in the Caribbean. 
 FLOW Sports is the Caribbean's second 24- hour sports cable channel which is being aired in several Caribbean countries and Panama.
FLOW Sports is the only regional channel that broadcast in full High Definition (HD) from a state of the art broadcasting studio located in Trinidad.
 JET – Jamaica Education TV
 FLOW TV Michele English, president and chief operating officer of Flow in Jamaica, put the local content drive in the context of the company's development. She said that when Flow started its service in Jamaica five years ago, "we made a promise that we would continuously innovate". And English welcomed all to the relaunch of the revamped Flow TV. She made it clear that "we do not have any intention of becoming a broadcaster", while welcoming programmes in business, education, lifestyle, and those targeting children. English positioned Flow TV as "an affordable option for local producers", thereby providing them an opportunity to earn extra income. Michael Look Tong, head of media services, gave an even wider perspective on Flow TV's local content initiative, saying that Flow is moving towards being a user-generated channel with new and interesting content.
Flow which was once owned by Columbus Communications is currently owned by Cable and Wireless Plc (CWC). However, in November 2015, the board of CWC approved the sale of CWC to Liberty Global who had made an offer.
 JUICE TV Jamaica -Cultural, Entertainment and Music TV Station based in Mandeville, Jamaica
 Caribbean Gospel TV - Caribbean Gospel TV (CGTV) is a 24/7 faith and family-based television network that features programs for the Caribbean communities and diaspora.

Martinique 
Note: All transmissions in Martinique are in digital terrestrial television

Local channels
 Channel 1, Martinique La 1ère
 Channel 2, viàATV (Some of TF1 and M6 programmes)
 Channel 3, Kanal Matinik Television (KMT)
 Channel 4, France 2
 Channel 5, France 3
 Channel 6, France 4
 Channel 7, France 5
 Channel 9, ARTE
 Channel 10, franceinfo
 Channel 11, Zitata TV

On cable TV (SFR Caraïbe) – more local channels :
 Martinique La 1ère
 viàATV
 KMT
 Zouk TV
 LCC
 Annonces TV
 Graphé TV
 TV Famille
 APTV (live internet)

Montserrat 
 People's Television, Manjack, Montserrat [Free to Air]
 ZTV, Sweeney's Montserrat [Cable]

Puerto Rico 
 See Television stations in the Puerto Rico market

Saba 
 PJF-TV 3 (LBC) (Saba)
 PJB-TV 6 (Tele Curaçao, Bonaire/Saba)
 PJS-TV 6 (LBC, Saba)
 RCTV 10
 PJF-TV-1 11 (ABC, Saba)

Saint Barthélemy 
Note: All transmissions in Saint Barthélemy are in digital terrestrial television

Local channels
 Channel 1, Guadeloupe La 1ère
 Channel 3, France 2
 Channel 4, France 3
 Channel 5, France 4
 Channel 6, France 5
 Channel 8, ARTE
 Channel 9, franceinfo

Saint Kitts and Nevis 
 ZIZ-TV 2 and 5, Basseterre, Saint Kitts and Nevis
 NTV-TV 8, Charlestown, Saint Kitts and Nevis
 St Kitts Visitor Channel 70

Saint Lucia 
 Daher Broadcasting System (DBS) Channel 10 (Cable Channel 35), Castries, Saint Lucia
 National Television Network (NTN 2) – Saint Lucia
 VQH-TV 4 and 5 (Helen Television System Channel 4,(Cable: Channel 34) Castries, Saint Lucia
 EWTN Channel 6, Castries, Saint Lucia
 Think Caribbean Television (TCT) Channel 36 (Cable Only), Castries, Saint Lucia
 Choice39 TV Channel 39 (Cable Only), Castries, Saint Lucia
 Scruffy TV Channel 45 (Internet, Cable, Mobile Device), Castries, Saint Lucia
 ((Calabash TV)) Channel 44 (LIME) Channel 54, (Karib Kable), Castries, Saint Lucia
 SHINE TV – Channel 49 LIME, Channel 53 Karib Cable, [Castries, Saint Lucia]
 The Visitor Channel 40 LIME & 51 FLOW,
GVD Caribbean 115 Flow

Saint Vincent and the Grenadines 
 Saint Vincent and the Grenadines Broadcasting Corporation (SVGBC)  – Saint Vincent and the Grenadines
 ZBG-TV Channel 9, with repeaters on 7, 10, 11, 13, 14, (CBS / CNN / Caribbean Media Corporation), Kingstown, Saint Vincent and the Grenadines
 TBN Channel 4, Kingstown, Saint Vincent and the Grenadines
 IKTV Channel 45, IKTV, Prospect, St Vincent and the Grenadines
 Vincentian Cultural Connection Channel(VC3TV) Your Sports & Culture Network - Victoria Park, Kingstown, St. Vincent & The Grenadines

Saint Martin 
 PJF-TV 7 (LBC) (Philipsburg, Sint Maarten)
 PJM-TV 9 (Naked Boy Hill, Sint Maarten)
 TV 15 on St.Maarten Cable TV
 TVCARiB on WTN, TELTV+, MSR Cable Fr. St. Martin]]

Trinidad and Tobago 
See: List of television stations in Trinidad and Tobago, and Template:Trinidad-Tobago-TV

Turks and Caicos 
 Oasis Media Centre 4NEWS HD Local Community News Station, Providenciales
 People's Television Channel 8 Cable Television Services, Providenciales
 Turks & Caicos Television Cable Television Services, Grand Turk

United States Virgin Islands 
 See Television Stations in Saint Croix/Charlotte Amalie

Regional cable stations 
 Multi-Choice TV
 Nexus – The Caribbean Connection to the World...
 Hype TV – Premiere Caribbean Entertainment TV Station based in Kingston, Jamaica
 RE TV – Music and Entertainment from Jamaica
 Tempo TV – A Caribbean-centric cable television channel
 CaribVision – A Caribbean-centric cable television channel by the Caribbean Media Corporation.
 Gayelle TV – Trinidad and Tobago
 Caribbean Super Station
 SportsMax – sports cable channel, based in Kingston, Jamaica
 Caribbean Faith Network
 WSEE-TV – the CBS affiliate station in Erie, Pennsylvania, which airs a broadcast feed on cable and satellite for Caribbean viewers (with localized weather forecasts, commercials and infomercials in place of its local newscasts), as part of the Primetime 24 group of channels.
FLOW Sports – Regionwide cable station run by FLOW broadcasting sports content 24/7 in Full HD.

See also
List of countries by number of television broadcast stations
List of local television stations in South America
List of television networks by country
List of television stations in Brazil
List of television stations in Latin America
List of television stations in North America by media market
Lists of television channels
North American call sign

References

Further reading
A contextual macro-analysis of media in the Caribbean in the 1990s, Brown, Aggrey – History of television media in the Caribbean/West Indies during the 1990s
 

Caribbean-related lists
Communications in the Caribbean